I Remember Miles refers to the following Miles Davis tribute albums
I Remember Miles (Benny Golson album), released in 1993
I Remember Miles (Shirley Horn album), released in 1998